Harpers may refer to: 

 Harpers, popular misnomer for Harper's Magazine, American monthly magazine
 Harper's Bazaar, monthly American fashion magazine
 Harpers Wine & Spirit, formerly Harpers Magazine (since 1878), British trade publication  
 Harpers (Forgotten Realms), fictional organization in Forgotten Realms games
 Harper (publisher), an American publishing company

See also
 Harper's (disambiguation)
 Harper (disambiguation)
 Harpers Magazine (disambiguation)